Field Marshal (or field marshal, abbreviated as FM) is a five–star general officer rank and the highest attainable rank in the Indian Army. Field Marshal is ranked immediately above general, but not exercised in the regular army structure. It is a largely ceremonial or wartime rank, having been awarded only twice. A Field Marshal’s insignia consists of the national emblem over a crossed baton and sabre in a lotus blossom wreath.

Sam Manekshaw was the first Field Marshal of India, and was conferred the rank on 1 January 1973. The second was Kodandera M. Cariappa, who was conferred the rank on 15 January 1986.

Field Marshal is equivalent to an admiral of the fleet in the Indian Navy and a Marshal of the Indian Air Force in the Indian Air Force. In the Navy, Admiral of the Fleet has never been awarded, but from the Air Force, Arjan Singh was promoted to the rank of Marshal of the Indian Air Force.

History
To date, only two Indian Army officers have been conferred the rank. It was first conferred to Sam Manekshaw in 1973, in recognition of his service and leadership in the 1971 Indo-Pakistani War. In 1971, after the war, Prime Minister Indira Gandhi decided to promote Manekshaw to Field Marshal and subsequently to appoint him as the Chief of the Defence Staff (CDS). This appointment was dropped after several objections from the bureaucracy and the commanders of the Navy and the Air Force. On 3 January 1973, after his term as the Chief of the Army Staff (COAS) Manekshaw was conferred with the rank of Field Marshal at a ceremony held at Rashtrapati Bhavan. As it was the first appointment, several entitlements of the rank, including the badges and ribbons, were yet to be worked out. A few weeks before Manekshaw's appointment, the Field Marshal's badges of rank were made at the Army workshop in Delhi Cantonment. They were inspired by the British Field Marshal insignia.

The second individual to be conferred the rank was Kodandera M. Cariappa, the first Indian to serve as the Commander–in–Chief of the Indian Army. Unlike Manekshaw, who was conferred the rank just before his retirement, Cariappa was already retired in 1953, and since a field marshal never retires, therefore retired officers cannot be given the rank. But as a token of gratitude for the exemplary service rendered by him to the nation, the Government of India overruled the pre-established criteria, and conferred the rank of field marshal on him on 15 January 1986 at a special investiture ceremony held at Rashtrapati Bhavan.

Overview
Field Marshal is the five-star rank and highest attainable rank in the Indian Army. Though the rank is placed above general, it is not observed in the regular structure. It is a largely ceremonial or wartime rank, having been awarded only twice.

A Field Marshal receives the full pay of a four–star General, and is considered a serving officer until their death. They wear a full uniform on all ceremonial occasions. In addition to this, they also run an office in the Army Headquarters with a secretariat.

Field Marshal is equivalent to an Admiral of the Fleet in the Indian Navy or a Marshal of the Air Force in the Indian Air Force. While Arjan Singh is the only holder of the Marshal of the Air Force to date, no officer has ever been promoted to Admiral of the Fleet.

Insignia
A Field Marshal's insignia consists of the national emblem over a crossed baton and sabre in a lotus blossom wreath. On appointment, Field Marshals are awarded a gold-tipped baton which they may carry on formal occasions. The star insignia, which comprises five golden stars over a red strip, is used on car pennants, rank flags and as gorget patches.

Rank holders

Sam Manekshaw

Sam Manekshaw, MC (1914–2008), also known as "Sam Bahadur" ("Sam the Brave"), was the first Indian Army officer to be promoted to the rank of field marshal. Commissioned into the British Indian Army on 1 February 1935 with seniority  antedated to 4 February 1934, Manekshaw's distinguished military career spanned four decades and five wars, beginning with service in World War II. He was first attached to the 2nd Battalion of Royal Scots, and later posted to the 4th Battalion of 12th Frontier Force Regiment, commonly known as the 54th Sikhs. Following partition, he was reassigned to the 16th Punjab Regiment.

Manekshaw rose to be the 8th COAS of the Indian Army in 1969, and under his command Indian forces conducted successful campaigns against Pakistan in the Liberation War of Bangladesh in 1971.The war lasted for 09 months. Indian Army joined as an ally force with Bangladesh for 12 days from 3 December to 16 December. On 16 December 1971, Lt. Gen A. A. K. Niazi of the Pakistan Army signed the Instrument of Surrender at Dhaka in the presence of Lt. Gen. Jagjit Singh Aurora, Lt. Gen. J. F. R. Jacob and other Senior Officers of the Indian Army. More than 93000 Pakistani Soldiers surrendered to the allied force led by Indian Army, which was recorded as one among the largest surrender in the History. The decisive results achieved by the Indian Army during this war, under the able military leadership of Manekshaw, gave the nation a new sense of confidence, and in recognition of his services, in January 1973 the President of India conferred the rank of field marshal on him. He was also awarded the Padma Vibhushan and the Padma Bhushan, the second and third highest Indian civilian awards respectively, for his services to the Indian nation.

Controversies
Though Sam Manekshaw was conferred the rank of field marshal in 1973, it was reported that he was never given the complete allowances he was entitled to as a field marshal. It was not until President A.P.J. Abdul Kalam took the initiative when he met Manekshaw in Wellington, and made sure that the field marshal was presented with a cheque for ₹1.3 crores–his arrears of pay for over 30 years. Even more surprisingly, Manekshaw's funeral was not attended by the top brass from civil, military, or political leadership, because non parsis are not allowed to enter parsi funeral .

Kodandera Madappa Cariappa

Kodandera Madappa Cariappa, OBE (1899–1993), was the first Indian to be appointed as commander-in-chief (C-in-C) of the Indian Army. His distinguished military career spanned almost three decades. Cariappa joined the British Indian Army on 1 December 1920, and was commissioned as temporary second lieutenant in the 2/88 Carnatic Infantry. He was later transferred to 2/125 Napier Rifles, then to the 7th Prince of Wales Own Dogra Regiment in June 1922, and finally to the 1/7 Rajput, which became his parent regiment.

He was the first Indian officer to attend the course at Staff College, Quetta, the first Indian to command a battalion in the Indian Army, and also was one of the first two Indians selected to undergo a training course at the Imperial Defence College, Camberly, UK. He served in various staff capacities at various unit and command headquarters (HQ) and also at the General HQ, New Delhi.

He led the Indian forces in Kashmir during the Indo-Pakistani War of 1947. He was a member of the Army Sub Committee of the Forces Reconstitution Committee, which divided the British Indian Army into the Indian and Pakistani Armies after the Partition of India in 1947. After his retirement from the Indian Army in 1953, he served as the high commissioner to Australia and New Zealand until 1956. As a token of gratitude for the exemplary service rendered by him to the nation, the Government of India conferred the rank of field marshal on Cariappa in his 87th year, on 14 January 1986.

See also
 Army ranks and insignia of India
 Marshal of the Indian Air Force Arjan Singh
 Field marshal
 Five-star rank

Notes
Footnotes

Citations

References

Further reading

External links
 Profile on Sam Manekshaw Indian Army official website
 Profile on K. M. Cariappa Indian Army official website

Indian generals
India Army
Indian Army
Military ranks of the Indian Army
Five-star officers